Maria Jennifer Obregon Mitchell, also known by her screen name Sarsi Emmanuelle (born November 17, 1966) is a former dancer and actress in the Philippines. She earned a Best Actress nomination from the Gawad Urian Awards for Boatman.

Career
Emmanuelle was born in Manila and attended Immaculate Conception Academy of Manila, an exclusive all-girls' school. She was one of the popular Softdrinks Beauties introduced in the 1980s along with Pepsi Paloma and Coca Nicolas. She starred in box-office hit films such as Snake Sisters (1984) directed by Celso Ad. Castillo, Matukso kaya ang Anghel (1984) directed by Leonardo Garcia, Bomba Queen (1985) as Yvonne, directed by Efren C. Piñon, Virgin Forest (1985) directed by Peque Gallaga, and Boatman (1985) directed by Tikoy Aguiluz. She also starred in Mario O'Hara's Bed Sins (1985) with Al Tantay, in Lino Brocka's White Slavery (1985) with Ricky Davao, in Elwood Perez's Silip (1986) with Mark Joseph, and Romy Suzara's Nude City (1986) with Ernie Garcia. Emmanuelle appeared in the action film Gabi Na, Kumander (1986) with Phillip Salvador, Bembol Roco and Dindo Fernando.

Her life story featured in the ABS-CBN's Maalaala Mo Kaya in 2003 (played by Aubrey Miles). She played as the adoptive mother of Bea Alonzo in the TV series It Might Be You (2003–2004).

Filmography

References

External links

Sarsi Emmanuelle Movies Ads in video48
Sarsi Emmanuelle blogspot

Living people
Actresses from Manila
Filipino people of American descent
1966 births